Jean-Pierre Jeunet (born 3 September 1953) is a French film director, producer and screenwriter. His films combine fantasy, realism and science fiction to create idealized realities or to give relevance to mundane situations.

Debuting as a director with the acclaimed 1991 black comedy Delicatessen, with collaborator Marc Caro, Jeunet went to collaborate with Caro once again with The City of Lost Children (1995). His work with science fiction and horror led Jeunet to become the fourth director to helm the Alien film series with Alien Resurrection (1997), his first and only experience with an American film. In 2001, he achieved his biggest success with the release of Amélie, gaining international acclaim and reaching BBC's 100 Greatest Films of the 21st Century.

Widely regarded as one of the most influential and important directors in modern French cinema, his critical and commercial success earned him two Academy Award nominations.

Life and career
Jean-Pierre Jeunet was born in Roanne, France. He bought his first camera at the age of 17 and made short films while studying animation at Cinémation Studios. He befriended Marc Caro, a designer and comic book artist who became his longtime collaborator and co-director. They met at an animation festival in Annecy in the 1970s.

Together, Jeunet and Caro directed award-winning animations. Their first live action film was The Bunker of the Last Gunshots (1981), a short film about soldiers in a bleak futuristic world. Jeunet also directed numerous advertisements and music videos, such as Jean Michel Jarre's "Zoolook" (together with Caro).

Jeunet's films often resonate with the late twentieth-century French film movement cinéma du look and allude to themes and aesthetics involving German expressionism, French poetic realism, and the French New Wave.

Jeunet and Caro's first feature film was Delicatessen (1991), a melancholy comedy set in a famine-plagued post-apocalyptic world, in which an apartment building above a delicatessen is ruled by a butcher who kills people in order to feed his tenants.

They next made The City of Lost Children (1995), a dark, multi-layered fantasy film about a mad scientist who steals children's dreams so that he can live indefinitely. The success of The City of Lost Children led to an invitation to direct the fourth film in the Alien series, Alien Resurrection (1997). This is where Jeunet and Caro ended up going their separate ways as Jeunet believed this to be an amazing opportunity and Caro was not interested in a film that lacked creative control working on a big-budget Hollywood movie. Caro ended up assisting for a few weeks, with costumes and set design but afterwards, decided to work on a solo career in illustration and computer graphics.

Jeunet directed Amélie (2001), the story of a woman who takes pleasure in doing good deeds but has trouble finding love herself, which starred Audrey Tautou. Amélie was a huge critical and commercial success worldwide and was nominated for several Academy Awards. For his work on the film, Jeunet won a European Film Award for Best Director.

In 2004, Jeunet released A Very Long Engagement, an adaptation of the novel by Sébastien Japrisot.  The film, starring Audrey Tautou and Jodie Foster, chronicled a woman's search for her missing lover after World War I.

In 2009, he released Micmacs  which is about a man and his friends who come up with an intricate and original plan to destroy two big weapons manufacturers.

Jeunet has also directed numerous commercials including a 2'25" film for Chanel N° 5 featuring his frequent collaborator Audrey Tautou.

In 2013, Jeunet released The Young and Prodigious T.S. Spivet an adaptation of Reif Larsen's book The Selected Works of T.S. Spivet that starred Kyle Catlett.

In 2016, Jeunet and Romain Segaud co-directed the 3-minute stop-motion animation film Deux escargots s'en vont, based on a poem by Jacques Prévert.

Since his last release, Jeunet has tried to get other projects funded but has found it impossible to find investors willing to take a risk on his quirky films. He stated in 2019 that he may go to Netflix "as a last resort", and indeed his next film Big Bug was released by the streaming video company in 2022.

Filmography

Feature films

Short films

Music clips
 1984 : La Fille aux bas nylon by Julien Clerc
 1985 : Zoolook by Jean Michel Jarre, with Marc Caro
 1987 : 
 1987 : Hélène by Julien Clerc
 1988 : Souvenez-vous de nous by 
 1989 : Cache ta joie by Claudia Phillips
 1991 : L'Autre Joue by Lio
 2017: Pourvu by Gauvain Sers

Acting
 1981 : Le Bunker de la dernière rafale, by Jean-Pierre Jeunet and Marc Caro
 1983 : Pas de repos pour Billy Brakko, by Jean-Pierre Jeunet
 2015 : Institut Lumière remake, by Martin Scorsese (short film)

Awards and nominations

Césars 
 1981
 César Award for Best Animated Short Film for Le Manège
 1991
 César Award for Best Animated Short Film for Foutaises
 1992
 César Award for Best Debut for Delicatessen
 César Award for Best Writing for Delicatessen
 2002
 César Award for Best Film for Amélie 
 César Award for Best Director for Amélie 
 Nomination for César Award for Best Writing for Amélie
 2005
 Nomination for César Award for Best Film for A Very Long Engagement
 Nomination César Award for Best Director for A Very Long Engagement
 Nomination for César Award for Best Writing for A Very Long Engagement

Oscars 
 2002
 Nomination for Academy Award for Best Original Screenplay for Amélie 
 Nomination for Academy Award for Best Foreign Language Film for Amélie

European Film Awards 
 1991
 European Film Award for Best Film nomination for Delicatessen
 2001
 European Film Award for Best Film for Amélie 
 European Film Award for Best Director for Amélie
 European Film Academy People's Choice Award for Best European Film for Amélie
 2005
 Nomination for European Film Award for Best Director for A Very Long Engagement

Edgar Award 
 2005
 Edgar Award for best scenery for Amélie

Collaborations

Decorations 
 Commander of the Order of Arts and Letters (2016)

References

External links

 
 Jean-Pierre Jeunet's Official Site
 GreenCine's interview with Jeunet
 Jean-Pierre Jeunet – A Life in Pictures, filmed BAFTA event
 Jean-Pierre Jeunet at Virtual History

1953 births
Living people
People from Roanne
French male screenwriters
20th-century French screenwriters
21st-century French screenwriters
French film producers
Best Original Screenplay BAFTA Award winners
European Film Award for Best Director winners
César Award winners
Edgar Award winners
French film directors
Best Director César Award winners
Best Director Lumières Award winners
Chevaliers of the Légion d'honneur
Science fiction film directors
Horror film directors
French-language film directors
Commandeurs of the Ordre des Arts et des Lettres
People of Montmartre